Penrith Station may refer to

Penrith railway station, Sydney
Penrith railway station, UK